Heart on Wave/Breakin' Out is the second single by Japanese band Dream. First pressings included one of four trading cards (one of each member, and one of all three). It was also their first double A-side single, and a VHS single was released later on April 19, 2000. The single reached number 14 on the weekly Oricon charts and charted for six weeks.

Track list
 Heart on Wave (Original Mix) mixed by Dave Ford
 Heart on Wave (Instrumental)
 Heart on Wave (2FT Mix) remixed by Tatsuhiko Fuyuno
 Heart on Wave (Hal's Mix 2000) remixed by Hal
 Breakin' Out (Original Mix) mixed by Dave Ford
 Breakin' Out (Y&Co. Remix) remixed by Tetsuya "Remocon" Tamura (Y&Co. inc)
 Breakin' Out (Dub's Club Remix) remixed by Izumi "D・M・X" Miyazaki
 Breakin' Out (Instrumental)

Credits
 Lyrics: Yuko Ebine
 Music: Kazuhito Kikuichi

External links
 http://www.oricon.co.jp/music/release/d/45135/1/

2000 singles
Dream (Japanese group) songs
2000 songs
Avex Trax singles